Tudar-e Shah Karami (also Romanized as Tūdār-e Shāh Karamī; also known as Tūdar-e Shākerī) is a village in Mamulan Rural District, Mamulan District, Pol-e Dokhtar County, Lorestan Province, Iran. At the 2006 census, its population was 91, in 24 families.

References 

Towns and villages in Pol-e Dokhtar County